Manirampur Government Girls' High School (MGGHS) is a state secondary school for girls, located in Manirampur Upazila under Jessore District, Bangladesh. It is situated near Mohanpur Bot tola, just west of the Jessore-Chuknagar Highway.

History
The school was established as "Guru Training School" at the village Mohanpur in Manirampur Upazila during the reign of British Government in the Indian Subcontinent. That means Junior Training (J.T) was provided to the class 8 passed students to be teachers. The then C.O (Circle Officer) Mr. Mosharraf Hossain was the chairman of that training school. 
On 1 April 1965, the training school was turned into Junior High School by the sincere effort of local renowned persons. They are Moslem Uddin Gazi, Md. Jalal Uddin, Babu Dulal Chandra Das, Babu Girindra Nath Ghosh, Doctor Mohiuddin (father Adv. Shaheed Md. Iqbal, Mayor, Manirampur Municipality), The circle officer of Manirampur thana, Mr Raichuddin, School Inspector Syed Nabiruzzaman and other locals. The school started with 15–20 girl students in two tin-shed rooms. During that period, Mrs. Nurzahan Begum took over the responsibilities as a headmaster. She passed I.A. and was the wife of S.I. Syed Nabiruzzaman.

From 1965 to 1970, the school continued its education programme as a Junior School. On 21 September 1971, the school was approved to start class nine. On 12 August 1972, the school was permitted as a bilateral high school. Since then, the education programme of class 1–5 had been postponed. On February 2, 1987, the bilateral girls' high school was nationalized as per the announcement of Hussain Muhammad Ershad, President of Bangladesh. Then the school was named as Manirampur Government Girls' High School, Manirampur, Jessore. The then Deputy Commissioner of Jessore District, Moktader Chowdhury has also contribution for nationalizing the school. He managed to register 1.04 shatak of land for the school.

School compound
The school has two two-storeyed buildings. There are an auditorium, a library and a computer lab in the buildings. There is a pond in the school compound.

Education system 
The school follows the SSC curriculum in Bengali medium under the Board of Intermediate and Secondary Education, Jessore. The EIIN is 116118. The school has Science and Social Science division. According to the curriculum of 2010, all subject teachers have been provided C.P.D - 1 & 2 with cluster training by TQI-SEP with the support of the government and a three days training on creative question papers under the scheme of SESDP in order to develop the standard of education. 
With a view to applying and implementing the modern education system, the school operates the following methods :
 Yearly, monthly and daily syllabuses are followed and education related instruments are used for teaching. 
 Classes are taken through digital system using multimedia projectors. The teaching method of this school was recorded and telecasted on Bangladesh Television (BTV) on 30 September 2011 with the headline "Somvabonar Bangladesh". 
 For successive assessment, SBA system is maintained.
 Progressive report and guardian contact letter is maintained to keep the education network active.

Computer lab 
To make the students efficient in information technology, there is a computer lab in the school with some computers, laptops and multimedia projectors. Internet connection has also been taken through Broad Band line.

Administrative system 
The administrative system of the school is directed by the directorates of secondary and higher secondary education under the ministry of education. The deputy director of Khulna area looks after different aspects of the school. For managing the local administrative system, there is a strong board of directors consists of 5 members under the presidency of upazila executive officer (UNO).

Co-curriculum activities

Sports

Cultural programmes

Girl in Scout

Red crescent

Religious programme

Magazine

Tiffin

References

Educational institutions established in 1965
1965 establishments in East Pakistan
Schools in Jessore District
Girls' schools in Bangladesh
High schools in Bangladesh
State schools